The following is a list of cast members and characters from the Transformers film series.

Autobots
The Autobots are the main protagonists of the Transformers franchise who come from the planet called Cybertron.

Optimus Prime
Optimus Prime (voiced by Peter Cullen) is the leader of the Autobots, the last descendant of the Dynasty of Primes, keeper of the Matrix of Leadership and the narrator of the series. Optimus Prime transforms into a 1994 red and blue Peterbilt 379 semi-trailer truck in the first three films, a rusty 1973 Marmon HDT-AC 86 semi cab-over truck in the beginning of the fourth film, and later a blue and red 2014 Western Star 5700 OP Phantom semi-truck. 

In the first film, Optimus Prime arrives on Earth with Ratchet, Ironhide, and Jazz trying to find the AllSpark. At Mission City, he kills Bonecrusher and battles Megatron, but Sam pushes the AllSpark into Megatron's chest, killing him and destroying the cube; as a result, Cybertron can no longer be restored. Afterward, Optimus and the other Autobots form an alliance with the humans and work closely with NEST. 

In Revenge of the Fallen, Optimus is killed by Megatron during a battle with him, Starscream, and Grindor. Near the end of the film, he is revived by Sam with the Matrix of Leadership and is fused with Jetfire, making him more powerful. Optimus Prime then faces the Fallen and Megatron. After a vicious fight, Optimus severely wounds Megatron and kills the Fallen, saying "give me your face." 

In Dark of the Moon, Optimus revives Sentinel Prime using the Matrix of Leadership and reveals he was the leader of the Autobots before him. Sentinel betrays the Autobots and joins the Decepticons to restore Cybertron with the Pillars. During the battle in Chicago, Optimus kills some Decepticons, including the Driller, Shockwave, and Megatron before he kills Sentinel Prime. Optimus finally has a trailer similar to his Generation 1 counterpart, and has been redesigned to look more heroic. The trailer contains enhanced weapons and flight gear. Optimus loses his right arm to Sentinel Prime at the film's climax. 

In Age of Extinction, he is hunted by Harold Attinger and Lockdown, who is working for the Creators to bring him to Cybertron and kill any Autobots who refuse to give up his location. After being captured, Optimus tames the Dinobots and rides Grimlock to fight Galvatron and his new army of man-made Transformers. After defeating Galvatron's army, he kills Attinger and Lockdown. He sets the Dinobots free and asks his fellow Autobots to protect Cade and his family before taking the Seed into space and going after the Creators. At the start of the movie Optimus uses a mode similar to his G1 counterpart but with a lot of rust. 

In The Last Knight, Optimus arrives at Cybertron, now a dead planet. He finds Quintessa, the Prime of Life, who brainwashes Optimus to do her bidding of destroying the Earth, which she reveals is an ancient enemy planet, Unicron. She tells Prime that he must retrieve her staff to rebuild Cybertron. Prime's eyes turn purple and becomes Nemesis Prime under Quintessa's control. Just as he is about to kill Bumblebee, Bee speaks for the first time in ten years, which causes him to return to normal. He rides Dragonstorm into battle. After defeating Quintessa and saving both worlds, Optimus and the Autobots return to Cybertron, which has joined with the Earth into one planet.

Optimus Prime reappears in Bumblebee. He leads the Autobots against the Decepticons trying to take over Cybertron, but is forced to retreat when Decepticon reinforcements led by Soundwave and Shockwave attack them. Realizing that Cybertron has fallen, he orders all Autobots to get to their escape pods. He gives Bumblebee the task to protect the Earth and set up a base for them before being attacked by Ravage and other Decepticons.

In Transformers: Rise of the Beasts, Optimus Prime reappears and is similar to his G1 counterpart by now using a Freightliner semi-trailer truck mode

Bumblebee
Bumblebee (voiced by Dylan O'Brien in Bumblebee, Mark Ryan in the 2007 film and the Revenge of the Fallen video game, Erik Aadahl in The Last Knight) is an Autobot scout, Hot Rod's brother-in-arms, and Sam's former guardian in the first three films. Bumblebee transforms into various types of Chevrolet Camaros which are mostly fifth generation Chevrolet Camaros.

In "Transformers" Sam Witwicky purchases a dirty 1977 Chevrolet Camaro, but it reveals it's actually an Autobot: Bumblebee. Later Bumblebee turns into a 2007 Chevrolet Camaro. 

In Revenge of the Fallen, despite being repaired at the end of the 2007 film, Bumblebee's voice still uses radio soundbites to communicate, and Sam tells Mikaela that Bumblebee is "playing it up".

For Age of Extinction, Bumblebee is a modified vintage 1967 Chevrolet Camaro, and later a 2014 Chevrolet Camaro concept. He appears after Optimus calls all the Autobots and has a rivalry with Drift. He later aids Hound in a battle and rides Strafe. 

In The Last Knight, Bumblebee transforms into a 2017 Chevrolet Camaro and is accidentally given a female voice. Near the end, his real voice speaks again to Optimus, turning him back to normal and snapping him out of Quintessa's brainwashing. Flashbacks reveal that he and Hot Rod were the first Autobots to arrive on Earth and fought alongside the Allied forces to fight the Nazi Party during World War II, and transformed to a 1937 Mercedes-Benz Typ 320. He also knows Edmund from when they first met before he met Sam, and has the ability to reassemble himself after being blown to pieces. 

In the Bumblebee prequel, he is redesigned to look like his G1 counterpart and transforms into a 1967 Volkswagen Beetle. In the film, he lands on Earth after Cybertron falls to the Decepticons. After his synthetic voice communicator is ripped out and destroyed by Blitzwing, he escapes and befriends Charlie Watson. He comes into conflict with Decepticons Shatter and Dropkick, who are looking for him to learn Optimus Prime's location. After being captured by Sector 7, led by Jack Burns, Shatter and Dropkick interrogate him. Bumblebee manages to kill them, and he and Charlie part ways so he can be with Optimus Prime and the other Autobots.

Bumblebee reappears in Rise of the Beasts looking similar to his look in Transformers with a changed head.

Jazz
Jazz (voiced by Darius McCrary in the first film, Andrew Kishino in Transformers: The Game) is the first lieutenant of the Autobots and Optimus Prime's second-in-command. Jazz transforms into a modified silver 2007 Pontiac Solstice Custom Hardtop GXP, and is armed with a crescent blaster. He is killed by Megatron during the battle in Mission City.

Ironhide
Ironhide (voiced by Jess Harnell in the films, Mark Ryan in Transformers: The Game) is the Autobots' English-accented weapons specialist who transforms into a modified black 2007 GMC TopKick C4500 medium-duty truck. Ironhide is armed with shell cannons. 

In Dark of the Moon, he has a new rifle and a new rocket launcher. In Revenge of the Fallen, Ironhide takes down the Demolishor with Prime in Shanghai, then later takes over as the Autobots' leader when Optimus is killed by Megatron in the forest. He leads the Autobots in the desert battle and helps Sam get to the pillars where Optimus lies. He is heavily damaged and forced to drop his heavy cannons during an airstrike. 

In Dark of the Moon, he helps Sideswipe take down Dreads as they chase Sentinel to NEST. Sentinel Prime betrays the Autobots and kills Ironhide with a cosmic rust-shooting cannon that makes his parts rust and fall off. He also appears in a photo in Age of Extinction and The Last Knight.

Ratchet
Ratchet (voiced by Dennis Singletary in Bumblebee, Robert Foxworth in four films, Fred Tatasciore in Transformers: The Game) is the Autobots' medical officer who transforms into a Los Angeles Fire Department Search and Rescue 2007 Hummer H2. Ratchet is armed with heavy machine guns and a saw. For Dark of the Moon, Ratchet's alt mode has a new green and white paint job. In Age of Extinction, he has his spark torn out by Lockdown and his corpse is taken to KSI, who melts his head to build remote controlled Transformers.

Ratchet reappears in a speaking cameo in Bumblebee, looking like his G1 self, where he is among the Autobots seen evacuating Cybertron.

Sideswipe
Sideswipe (voiced by André Sogliuzzo in Revenge of the Fallen, James Remar in Dark of the Moon, Fred Tatasciore in Transformers: The Game, John DiMaggio in the Revenge of the Fallen video game) is the Autobots' combat instructor who transforms into a 2009 silver Chevrolet Corvette Stingray concept. In Dark of the Moon, Sideswipe's vehicle mode is upgraded into a convertible Corvette. While Sideswipe goes completely unmentioned in Age of Extinction, he is most likely either killed by either Cemetery Wind or Lockdown.

Sideswipe's data on whether he is alive is unknown.

Jolt
Jolt is a technician Autobot armed with a pair of electro-whips who transforms into a blue 2008 Concept Chevrolet Volt. He appears in Revenge of the Fallen where he used his whips to fuse Jetfire's parts onto Optimus.

Jolt does not appear in Dark of the Moon as he was likely killed by Shockwave before the film was released.

The Twins
The Twins are the result of a split Spark that resulted in two Autobots.

 Skids (voiced by Tom Kenny) is an Autobot infiltrator and Mudflap's twin who transforms into the front half of a white/pink 1937 Dodge ice cream truck, and later a green 2007 Chevrolet Beat. He has an oversized right arm. Skids is armed with a grappling hook. Although Skids was cut from Dark of the Moon, the novelization and comic book adaptions show that he is killed by Sentinel Prime.
 Mudflap (voiced by Reno Wilson) is an Autobot infiltrator and Skids's twin who transforms into the back half of a white/pink Dodge Ice Cream truck, and later an orange 2007 Chevrolet Trax. He has an oversized left arm. Although Mudflap was cut from Dark of the Moon, the novelization and comic book adaptions show that he is killed by Sentinel Prime.

Arcee Sisters
The Arcee Sisters are three Autobots that transform into motorcycles. The holographic rider for them is portrayed by Erin Naas.
 Arcee (voiced by Liza Koshy in Rise of the Beasts and Grey DeLisle in  Bumblebee and Revenge of the Fallen) is a female Autobot who transforms into a pink Ducati 848. Arcee is armed with a machine gun. She is killed by a Decepticon. In Age of Extinction, Arcee is listed as deceased by Cemetery Wind. She reappears in Bumblebee as one of the few Autobots who left Cybertron on escape pods and is a member of the Autobot resistance.
 Chromia is one of Arcee's sisters who transforms into a blue 2008 Suzuki B-King. Chromia is armed with a machine gun. She is the only one seen to be functional at the end of the film, but Roberto Orci and Alex Kurtzman claimed that all the sisters were killed in the Battle of Egypt.
 Elita-One is another of Arcee's sisters who transforms into a purple MV Agusta F4 R312. Elita-One is armed with a machine gun. She is slain by an unnamed Decepticon.

Jetfire
Jetfire (voiced by Mark Ryan in the film, Clive Revill in the Revenge of the Fallen video game) is a Cockney-accented Seeker and former Decepticon turned Autobot who transforms into a Lockheed SR-71 Blackbird. Jetfire is armed with a missile launcher. His wounds and age have made him choose to fight on the side of the Autobots. He walks with a cane, which doubles as a battle axe. He sacrifices his spark to allow Optimus Prime to utilize his components and weaponry to destroy the Fallen.

Wheelie
Wheelie (voiced by Tom Kenny) is a Decepticon spy-turned-Autobot and a partner of Brains who transforms into a blue radio-controlled toy monster truck and speaks with a Brooklyn accent. In The Last Knight, Wheelie joins the other Autobots in Cade's junkyard.

Brains
Brains (voiced by Reno Wilson) is a small and intelligent Decepticon drone turned Autobot and a partner of Wheelie who transforms into a Lenovo ThinkPad Edge laptop computer. Brains is armed with a micro shotgun. In Age of Extinction, Brains reappears, but loses his right leg after crashing into a river inside a Decepticon ship. His fate in The Last Knight is unknown.

Sentinel Prime
Sentinel Prime (voiced by Leonard Nimoy) is another descendant of the Dynasty of Primes, the first leader of the Autobots and the captain of the Ark who transforms into a red and black Rosenbauer Panther 6x6 airport crash tender fire truck. He makes a secret deal with Megatron to restore and rebuild Cybertron to bring the Pillars (including the Control Pillar) to Earth's moon and later to Chicago, in order to transport Cybertron to Earth/Unicron's atmosphere on Quintessa's behalf. After Bumblebee and Ratchet destroy the Pillars and Megatron interferes with his fight against Optimus, Sentinel is killed by Optimus after trying to justify his claims.

His head makes a cameo appearance at the KSI building in Age of Extinction and is not converted into Transformium.

Mirage
Mirage (voiced by Pete Davidson in Rise of the Beasts, Francesco Quinn in Dark of the Moon) is an Autobot spy who has wrist blades and transforms into a red 2011 Ferrari 458 Italia and speaks with an Italian accent. He was credited as "Dino".

Wheeljack
Wheeljack (voiced by Steve Blum in Bumblebee, Cristo Fernández in Rise of the Beasts, George Coe in Dark of the Moon, Erik Passoja in Transformers: The Game, Jamie Alcroft in the Dark of the Moon video game) is an eccentric Autobot scientist who speaks with an Irish accent, whose head design resembles Albert Einstein in reference to his genius and he transforms into a blue 2011 Mercedes-Benz E550. Wheeljack is an inventor who gives the Autobots weapons and equipment he has created. He is killed by a Decepticon when Soundwave orders his execution. He is credited     as Que

In Bumblebee, he is one of the Autobots who escaped Cybertron in an escape pod and is redesigned to look like his G1 design.

Hound
Hound (voiced by John Goodman in the films, Daniel Ross in Transformers: The Game) is an Autobot commando who transforms into a dark green Oshkosh Defense Medium Tactical Truck in Age of Extinction. Hound is the heavy weapons expert of the small group that carries various types of guns, grenades, and a knife.

Hound returns in The Last Knight as an olive green Mercedes-Benz Unimog military tactical ambulance and acts as the medic after Ratchet's death.

Drift
Drift (voiced by Ken Watanabe) is an Autobot tactician, a former Decepticon and a Triple Changer who transforms into a black and blue 2014 Bugatti Veyron Grand Sport Vitesse and a Cybertronian helicopter. His robot is modeled after a samurai warrior with a braided beard. Drift is partnered with Dinobot Slug, who he rides into battle at the film's climax.

Drift returns in The Last Knight as a black and red 2017 Mercedes-AMG GT-R, abandoning his helicopter form.

Crosshairs
Crosshairs (voiced by John DiMaggio) is an Autobot paratrooper who transforms into a green 2014 C7 Corvette Stingray in Age of Extinction. He rides Scorn into battle at the film's climax, and later nicknames him Spike.

Crosshairs returns in The Last Knight as a green 2017 Chevy Corvette C7 Stingray.

Hot Rod
Hot Rod (voiced by Omar Sy) is an Autobot protector and Viviane's guardian who was first seen as a 1975 Citroën DS in disguise, and then transforming into an orange and black 2017 Lamborghini Centenario sports car. Hot Rod speaks with a French accent, much to his own embarrassment. In flashbacks, he and Bumblebee helped fight the Nazis during World War II.

Sqweeks
Sqweeks (voiced by Reno Wilson) is a small Autobot 1965 Vespa 150 Scooter (motorcycle) and Izabella's only friend who struggles to communicate and has trouble transforming due to prior damage and has the ability to change his new arm into a gun.

Cogman
Cogman (voiced by Jim Carter) is a human-sized sociopathic Autobot 2017 Aston Martin DB11 Headmaster who acts as Sir Edmund Burton's butler. Despite his status, his Headmaster ability is not demonstrated.

Canopy
Canopy (voiced by an uncredited actor) is an Autobot refugee who can disguise himself as a pile of rubble and is friends with Izabella and Sqweeks. He is mistakenly shot down and killed by TRF, believing him to be a Decepticon trying to harm kids who had trespassed into a restricted zone. When Izabella vows to repair him, Canopy tells her to run and thanks her for the companionship Volvo articúlate dump truck Articulated hauler.

Daytrader
Daytrader (voiced by Steve Buscemi) is an Autobot scavenger who transforms into a cloaked rusty Mercedes-Benz LK Model 1920 dump truck. He is seen arriving at Cade's junkyard after salvaging old Transformers parts from old battles for profit and finding a ship for the Autobots to leave. Daytrader is similar to the Autobot Wreck-Gar. Bumblebee once swore at him cause of giving him a female voice.

Trench
Trench is an Autobot who has a similar body to Scrapper and transforms into a yellow Caterpillar 320 excavator. He made a cameo in The Last Knight, transforming when the Decepticons are approaching Cade's junkyard, forcing Cade, the Autobots, and the others to escape. His fate is unknown.

Cliffjumper
Cliffjumper (voiced by Andrew Morgado) is an Autobot who appears in Bumblebee. While on the Moons of Saturn sometime after the evacuation of Cybertron, Cliffjumper is killed by Dropkick after refusing to reveal the location of Optimus Prime before Bumblebee kills Dropkick on Earth. Chronologically, he is the first Autobot to be killed and die onscreen.

Brawn
Brawn (voiced by Kirk Baily) is an Autobot who made an appearance in Bumblebee being among the Autobots that evacuated Cybertron. Brawn looks like his G1 self.

Stratosphere
Stratosphere (voiced by John DiMaggio) is an Autobot Air-Soldier who transforms into a cargo plane that provides transportation for the Autobots in their global adventure who debuts in Rise of the Beasts.

Transit
Transit (voiced by John DiMaggio) a Transformer of an unknown faction that transforms into a School bus.

Wreckers
The Wreckers are a trio of Autobots who transforms into NASCAR Sprint Cup Series Gen-5 Chevrolet Impala stock cars as disguises. Two represent Hendrick Motorsports and one represents Earnhardt Ganassi Racing. They also work on the Autobots' ship Xantium.

Leadfoot
Leadfoot (voiced by John DiMaggio in a Cockney accent) is the Wreckers' leader who transforms into an armored version of the #42 Earnhardt Ganassi Racing Target car driven at the time by Juan Pablo Montoya. Leadfoot is armed with general-purpose machine guns and a right shoulder rotary machine gun.

In Age of Extinction, he appears in drone video footage, being attacked and killed by Cemetery Wind agents or Lockdown. Cade, who hacks a Cemetery Wind's spy drone, shows the footage to the Autobots, compelling Hound to salute his fallen friend.

Roadbuster
Roadbuster (voiced by Ron Bottitta) is the second-in-command of the Wreckers who transforms into an armored version of the #88 Hendrick Motorsports AMP Energy/National Guard car, and speaks with a Scottish accent. Roadbuster is armed with light machine guns, a left shoulder rotary machine gun, and shoulder mounted missile launchers.

Topspin
Topspin (voiced by Steven Barr) is one of the three Wreckers who transforms into an armored version of the #48 Hendrick Motorsports Lowe's/Kobalt driven by Jimmie Johnson, and appears to have claws on his hands. Topspin is armed with heavy machine guns.

In The Last Knight, he is seen in Cuba under the protection of Seymour Simmons and credited as "Volleybot".

Dinobots
The Dinobots are the large Cybertronian Knights who transform into giant mechanical spiked dinosaurs. In Age of Extinction, they are captured inside of their ship, which Lockdown took over as his prison ship until they are freed by Optimus. In The Last Knight, only Grimlock and Slug reappear.

Grimlock
Grimlock (voiced by Gregg Berger in Rise of the Dark Spark) is the leader of the Dinobots who transforms into a horned mechanical fire-breathing Tyrannosaurus, and formerly partnered with Optimus to ride on him.

Strafe
Strafe is one of the Dinobots who specializes in assault infantry and transforms into a mechanical two-headed, two-tailed Pteranodon, and formerly partnered with Bumblebee. He is similar to the Dinobot Swoop.

Slug
Slug is the savage destroyer amongst the Dinobots who transforms into a mechanical spiked and bestial Triceratops and formerly partnered with Drift.

Scorn
Scorn is the Dinobots' demolition specialist who appears in Age of Extinction and transforms into a mechanical three-sailed Spinosaurus and formerly partnered with Crosshairs.

Mini Dinobots
The Mini Dinobots are a group of small counterparts to Grimlock, Strafe and Slug. They appear with Grimlock and Slug and live in Cade's junkyard. Only mini version of scorn did not appear. Also it's unknown how they exist. 

Sharp T! is a mini version of Grimlock who learns to spit fire just like Grimlock. 

'Tops is a mini version of Slug. 

Pterry is a mini version of Strafe with only one head. He is mentioned to be trained by Cade Yeager.

Burton's Autobot allies
The following Autobots are allied with Sir Edmund Burton and Cogman:

Bulldog
Bulldog (voiced by Mark Ryan) is an Autobot who acts as a sentry for Sir Edmund Burton's castle and transforms into an army green Mark IV tank. Bulldog suffers from "robot dementia".

Lieutenant
Lieutenant (voiced by Mark Ryan) resembles a tweaked version of Jetfire and transforms into a Supermarine Spitfire (although this is not shown). He made a cameo in The Last Knight within Edmund's castle in response to TRF's arrival, but crashed to the ground.

Unidentified submarine
An unidentified HMS Alliance submarine Autobot takes Cade, Viviane, Cogman and Bumblebee to the Knights' sunken ship to recover the Staff of Merlin in The Last Knight who does not transform on screen, but is mentioned to be a Transformer by Santos and is referred to as "she".

Maximals
The Maximals are a faction of Transformers that debut in Rise of the Beasts and sport beast modes.

Optimus Primal
Optimus Primal (voiced by Ron Perlman) is the leader of the Maximals who transforms into a gorilla.

Airazor
Airazor (voiced by Michelle Yeoh) is a Maximal who transforms into a peregrine falcon.

Rhinox
Rhinox (voiced by David Sobolov) is the tech expert of the Maximals crew, close friend and brother figure of Optimus Primal, and the second-in-command who transforms into a rhinoceros.

Cheetor
Cheetor is a rash Maximal scout and son figure of Optimus Primal who transforms into a cheetah.

Decepticons
The Decepticons are the main antagonists of the Transformers franchise and the enemies of the Autobots.

In five films, 48 Decepticons have appeared in the series.

The Fallen
The Fallen (voiced by Tony Todd in the film, James Arnold Taylor in the video game), formerly Megatronus, is a rogue Prime of the Dynasty of Primes, the founder and first of the Decepticons, and Megatron's mentor.

In 17,000 B.C., he and his brothers set out into the universe seeking distant suns to harvest to create Energon by building Star Harvesters, but the Fallen defies his brothers rule to “Never destroy a planet with life” by building a Star Harvester on Earth to destroy both the planet and its sun. He steals the Matrix of Leadership, which is the only thing that can turn on the machine. His brothers stop him, takes the Matrix, and hides it from him. Years after his betrayal, he is found on the Nemesis, which crash landed on one of Saturn's moons, in suspended animation. He can open Space Bridges at will, and has telekinesis, powers that are restricted to the original Dynasty of Primes. He wields a void scepter as a melee weapon. In the film, the Fallen seeks to invade the Earth with an army of Decepticons and activate the Star Harvester for an alternative Energon source, as well as get revenge on humanity and the Autobots. He lands on Earth and uses the Earth's telecommunications grid (being hijacked by Megatron and Soundwave) to force the humans to hand over Sam Witwicky in order to guide the Decepticons to the Matrix of Leadership. In the final battle, the Fallen steals the Matrix from a revived Optimus Prime and starts up the Star Harvester. As the Star Harvester charges, Jetfire sacrifices himself to let Optimus utilize his components. After Ratchet and Jolt fuse Optimus with Jetfire's weaponry, Optimus Prime destroys the Star Harvester and the Fallen is killed by Optimus Prime who tears off his face (which reveals his skull) and crushes his spark.

Megatron
Megatron (voiced by Hugo Weaving in the first three films, Frank Welker in the video games and The Last Knight, Fred Tatasciore in the Dark of the Moon video game) is the leader of the Decepticons.

Millennia before the films, Megatron crash-landed on Earth in the Arctic in his quest to obtain the AllSpark. When he is defrosted, he keeps his original alien jet form out of vanity. During the final battle in Mission City, Megatron kills Jazz and duels Optimus Prime. After being weakened by human fighter jets, Megatron is killed by Sam, who pushes the AllSpark into his spark core. Later, Megatron's body is dumped into the deepest part of the Laurentian Abyss.

Megatron returns in Revenge of the Fallen. Megatron is resurrected by Scalpel and the Constructicons with a shard of the AllSpark. Upon being revived, Megatron gains a new alternative mode as a Cybertronian flying tank. He kills Optimus Prime and both he and Soundwave hijack the Earth's telecommunications systems, allowing the Fallen to send a message that Sam be handed over to him. In Egypt, Megatron fights a resurrected Optimus, but is overpowered and badly damaged, losing the right side of his face and his right arm in the process. He watches as the Fallen is destroyed, and retreats with Starscream, swearing revenge.

In Dark of the Moon, despite his right arm and his half face repaired, Megatron goes into hiding in Tanzania, and takes the form of a Mack Titan 10-wheeler tanker truck. Megatron makes a secret deal with former Autobot leader Sentinel Prime to invade the Earth with an army using Space Bridge pillars, and use humanity to rebuild their damaged planet together. Megatron is betrayed by Sentinel and has command of the Decepticons taken from him. During the battle in Chicago, Carly goads Megatron back into action, and he ambushes and cripples Sentinel. When Cybertron's trip through the Space Bridge fails, Megatron attempts to make a false truce with Optimus, but the latter sees through the ruse and attacks Megatron before he could shoot Optimus, tearing off Megatron's head with an energon axe before using his fusion shotgun to kill Sentinel. 

In Age of Extinction, Megatron's head is seen at KSI where Brains discovers that Megatron's mind is still alive and in a deep stasis. Megatron silently manipulates Joshua Joyce and his creation of the artificial Transformers as part of his conscious gets placed into Galvatron that transforms into a freightliner argosy cab-over truck.

In The Last Knight, Megatron is somehow revived and searches for the talisman to find Quintessa's staff after regaining some of his Decepticons that were held captive by the TRF. In the final battle on Cybertron, he is defeated by Optimus when Optimus cuts off his right arm as he did in Revenge of the Fallen, and is kicked through a wall, sending him falling back to Earth. His final fate is unknown.

Starscream
Starscream (voiced by Charlie Adler in the films, Daniel Ross in Transformers: The Game, Steve Blum in the Dark of the Moon video game) is Megatron's apprentice and second-in-command who transforms into a Lockheed Martin F-22 Raptor jet.

In Dark of the Moon, Starscream is killed by Sam.

In The Last Knight, his head is in Daytrader's possession, who claims he found it in Buffalo, New York. Later it is seen being held by Megatron reminiscing about him.

Starscream in his G1 design appears in a cameo in Bumblebee attacking the Autobots during their evacuation of Cybertron.

Blackout
Blackout (voiced by Noah Nelson in Transformers: The Game) is a first-strike Decepticon and the first Transformer seen who transforms into a MH-53J Pave Low III helicopter. Blackout is extremely loyal to Megatron. He is later killed when Lennox fires sabot rounds into his leg while he is strafed by F-22s.

Scorponok
Scorponok is a Decepticon mechanical scorpion and a minion of Blackout, attached to his back. After being damaged by gunships and losing his tail, Scorponok retreats beneath the sand.

In Revenge of the Fallen, Scorponok returns, where he wounds Jetfire, but Jetfire crushes his head and kills him.

Barricade
Barricade (voiced by Jess Harnell in the films, Keith David in Transformers: The Game, Frank Welker in Dark of the Moon) is a Decepticon scout who transforms into a black Saleen S281 police car, whom Frenzy guides to Sam. He is shown as Bumblebee's rival. In Dark of the Moon, he appears in the Battle of Chicago last seen being shot in the head by a group of soldiers after a boom-stick blew off one of his legs.
Barricade returns in The Last Knight, transforming into a 2016 Ford Mustang Police Interceptor. His final fate in The Last Knight is unknown, but he is presumably killed.

Frenzy
Frenzy (voiced by Reno Wilson) is a small Decepticon spy and a minion of Barricade who transforms into a silver PGX Boombox and later in his head mode, a black Nokia 8800 without his body. When attacking a group of humans in the control rooms, Frenzy accidentally kills himself when one of his own disc blades goes full circle and slices his head in two.

In Revenge of the Fallen, Frenzy's head is seen in the basement of Simmons' mother's deli.

Bonecrusher
Bonecrusher (voiced by Jimmie Wood in the film, Daniel Riordan in Transformers: The Game) is a Decepticon who transforms into a Buffalo H Mine-Protected vehicle with a larger claw. When battling Optimus on the highway to Mission City, he is killed by Optimus.

Brawl 
Brawl (voiced by David Sobolov in Transformers: THe Game) is a Decepticon demolition specialist who transforms into an army green up-armed M1A1 Abrams. During the battle in Mission City, he loses his left arm by Ratchet. While firing his arm at soldiers, he is killed by Bumblebee.

In Dark of the Moon, Deep Desert Brawl from the ROTF toyline is used in the battle of Chicago before it is destroyed by Optimus.

Soundwave
Soundwave (voiced by Jon Bailey in Bumblebee, Frank Welker in the films, Peter Jessop in the Revenge of the Fallen video game, Isaac C. Singleton, Jr. in the Dark of the Moon video game) is the Decepticon Communication Officer and one of Megatron's most loyal lieutenants.

In Dark of the Moon, Soundwave transforms into a silver Mercedes-Benz SLS AMG who poses as a car given to Carly by Dylan Gould. He later has his brain exploded by Bumblebee in the battle of Chicago.

Soundwave appears in his G1 design in a speaking cameo in Bumblebee.

Ravage
Ravage (vocal effects provided by Frank Welker) is a Decepticon infiltration expert and Soundwave's minion that resembles a large one-eyed jaguar. He is de-spined by Bumblebee.

Ravage appears in his G1 design in a cameo in Bumblebee.

Reedman
Reedman (voiced by Frank Welker) is a one-eyed razor-thin robot. Reedman appears when Ravage deploys a load of marble-sized "microcons" that join together to form Reedman. Reedman's extremely thin frame serves him as his main ability, by making him virtually invisible as long as he is facing directly at his enemy.

Laserbeak
Laserbeak (voiced by Keith Szarabajka) is a Decepticon infiltration expert and Soundwave's minion that resembles a mechanical condor. Like Ravage, Laserbeak serves as a spy for the Decepticons, and transforms into a variety of electronic devices and a pink version of Bumblebee. He is killed on a Decepticon ship piloted by Bumblebee during the Battle of Chicago.

Sideways
Sideways (voiced by John DiMaggio) is a Decepticon surveillance agent who transforms into a silver Audi R8 hiding with Demolishor in Shanghai until he is discovered by the Autobots. After getting chased by Arcee, Chromia and Elita-One, He is killed in vehicle mode by Sideswipe in Revenge of the Fallen.

In Dark of the Moon, Sideways' character model is reused for an unnamed Decepticon in the battle of Chicago before it was destroyed by Optimus.

Scalpel
Scalpel (voiced by John Di Crosta) is a small spider-like medic and scientist, also known as the Doctor, equipped with a micro saw and tools who transforms into a lensmeter. He is used to extract information from Sam and is presumed killed offscreen by Optimus Prime.

In Dark of the Moon, similar looking Deceptions are seen crawling over and repairing Megatron's still-damaged head.

Alice
Alice (portrayed by Isabel Lucas) is an undercover Decepticon Pretender who intercepts Sam in college. She has a retractable long tongue and a retractable long spiked tail. Alice is killed by Mikaela.

Grindor
Grindor (voiced by Frank Welker in the film, Fred Tatasciore in the video game) is a Decepticon warrior who transforms into a CH-53E Super Stallion helicopter. His head is ripped apart by Optimus Prime in Revenge of The Fallen. Before his death, the Autobot leader cuts his right side blades in half, slices off his right arm to send it flying, slashes him on the left side of his chest, uses one of Starscream's missiles to destroy his main rotor, and throws one of his swords into his right leg.

Insecticon
The Insecticon is a small beetle-like Decepticon.

In Revenge of the Fallen, during the final battle of Egypt, an Insecticon searches for Sam before being deactivated by him.

In Age of Extinction, the Insecticons assist Brains in corrupting KSI's Galvatron with Megatron's consciousness.

Decepticon Protoforms
Decepticon Protoforms are various Decepticons who make up an army which appeared in each film sequels' climaxes.

In Dark of the Moon, they ride Cybertronian starfighters that can transform into Cybertronian hovercrafts and several large ships.

Hatchlings
Hatchlings are newborn Decepticons.

In Revenge of the Fallen, they transform into Eggs. They are seen onboard the Nemesis, but die due to a leak of Energon.

The Hatchlings later appeared in Dark of the Moon as Megatron's pets.

Shockwave
Shockwave (voiced by Jon Bailey in Bumblebee, Frank Welker in Dark of the Moon) is an emotionless Decepticon assassin. He is killed in the Battle of Chicago by Optimus. Like Scorponok, Shockwave doesn't transform in the film.

Shockwave in his G1 design appears in a speaking cameo in Bumblebee.

Visual effects supervisor Scott Farrar said that the lack of eyes and mouth in Shockwave's design means "you have to read Shockwave through just the emotions of his face, almost like a silent-era film star," which caused the eye to have an intrinsic design, with a lens, a moving iris and an oscillating light.

The Driller
The Driller is Shockwave's pet. It is a giant, tentacled Mongolian death worm-like Cybertronian creature that is used for drilling. The Driller appears tries to invade the engine part of the Ark, but Optimus stops it and it retreats. Later in the Battle of Chicago, Shockwave commands the Driller to tear down a large building, but it is decapitated and killed by Optimus Prime.

Igor
Igor (voiced by Greg Berg) is a deformed Decepticon that scurries about Megatron at his base in Africa. He is modeled after the head of Long Haul.

Loader
Loader is a Decepticon who made a cameo and is killed offscreen in the battle of Chicago.

Devcon
Devcon is a quadrupedal Decepticon in Chicago in Dark of the Moon. He is killed by the combined firepower of the Wreckers and NEST soldiers.

Watch-bot
The Watch-bot is a small centipede-like Decepticon spy who transforms into a wristwatch in Dark of the Moon. It was used by Dylan to place it on Sam before it was killed by Sam when the Autobots were assumed dead in the shuttle explosion.

Mohawk 
Mohawk (voiced by Reno Wilson) is a loyal Decepticon footsoldier who transforms into a Confederate Motorcycle. His TRF description states that he is IN CUSTODY, and that he is skilled with knives. Despite the fact that his alt mode is a relatively small motorcycle, his TRF description also states that Mohawk is 14 feet tall in robot mode. He is left behind after the Decepticons retreat from Cade and the Autobots before having his body destroyed by Bumblebee. He is still alive as his spark is in located in his head instead of his chest due to his small body.

Dreadbot
Dreadbot is a Decepticon thug who shares the same body of Crowbar and transforms into a rusty Volkswagen Type 2 with Christmas lights in his right arm. His TRF description states that he is "IN CUSTODY". He is killed and eaten by Grimlock.

Nitro Zeus
Nitro Zeus (voiced by John DiMaggio and Steven Barr) is a Decepticon hunter who transforms into a JAS-39 Gripen Fighter Jet. His TRF description states that he is "IN CUSTODY". Nitro is later killed after having his head blown off by Bumblebee.

Berserker
Berserker is a Decepticon commando who makes a cameo in The Last Knight. His TRF description states that he is "TO BE RELEASED UNDER NO CIRCUMSTANCES" and that he is a homicidal sociopath. He is selected by Megatron in a deal with TRF, but they refused claiming that Berserker is too dangerous to be released and he does not have enough Energon. So Megatron selects Onslaught instead.

Onslaught
Onslaught is a Decepticon tactician. His TRF description states that he is "IN CUSTODY". He is selected by Megatron after refusing to release Berserker. He dies after losing his right leg and head to Drift.

Shatter
Shatter (voiced by Angela Bassett) is a female Decepticon Triple Changer who transforms into a 1971 Plymouth GTX muscle car and a Harrier jump jet. She first appears in Bumblebee where she and Dropkick arrive on Earth and trick Sector 7 into helping them hunt Bumblebee. She is later killed by Bumblebee when he destroys a dam and her brain is destroyed in a collision between a large ship and a wall.

Dropkick
Dropkick (voiced by Justin Theroux) is a Decepticon Triple Changer and Shatter's partner who transforms into a blue and black AMC Javelin muscle car and a Bell AH-1 SuperCobra attack helicopter. He appears in Bumblebee where he and Shatter arrive on Earth and trick Sector 7 into helping them find Bumblebee. Dropkick is killed when Bumblebee tosses a chain into his propeller.

Blitzwing
Blitzwing (voiced by David Sobolov) is a Decepticon Seeker. He appears in Bumblebee where he ambushes Bumblebee while he was fleeing from Sector 7 and damages his voice box. Blitzwing is later killed by Bumblebee.

Seekers
The Seekers (voiced by Kirk Baily) are Decepticon foot soldiers that transform into Cybertronian jets. Shockwave orders them to destroy the launchpad to prevent the Autobots from escaping Cybertron.

Constructicons
The Constructicons are a Decepticon sub-faction who transform into construction vehicles in Revenge of the Fallen.

Devastator
He is physically unable to stand up straight. He is destroyed by a prototype railgun during the battle in Egypt.

The 8 combined vehicles of Devastator are the look-alikes of Mixmaster, Scavenger, Scrapper, Hightower, Scrapmetal, Overload, Long Haul, and Skipjack.

Demolishor
Demolishor is a large Constructicon who transforms into a white with red stripes Terex O&K RH 400 hydraulic mining excavator. He is killed when Optimus Prime shoots him in the right eye at point blank range. He is a stand in for the upper body of Devastator. Demolishor is voiced by Calvin Wimmer in the film and Fred Tatasciore in the video game.

Payload
Payload is a Constructicon who transforms into a yellow Caterpillar 773B dump truck. He appears in the final battle of Egypt, where he watches the Constructicons form Devastator.

Rampage
Rampage (voiced by Kevin Michael Richardson) is a Constructicon. He has his arms torn off by Bumblebee and is killed by him.

Skipjack
Skipjack joins the other Constructicons but they are all killed by a prototype railgun. He forms the left leg of Devastator.

Mixmaster
Mixmaster is a Constructicon who transforms into a black and silver Mack concrete mixer truck. He is briefly seen to have a third "battle mode" which appears to be a gun emplacement. According to his toy bio, he is an expert in chemistry and explosives who makes explosives and poisons for the other Decepticons' weapons. Some of the concept art shows him as a McNeilus mixer truck. He is killed by Jetfire. His copy forms the head of Devastator.

Long Haul
Long Haul (voiced by Neil Kaplan in the Revenge of the Fallen video game) is a Constructicon who transforms into a green Caterpillar 773B dump truck. Long Haul is armed with missile launchers. Long Haul's robot mode was designed by freelance artist Josh Nizzi as fan art of the original character, by the time Revenge of the Fallen had just been greenlit. The fan art impressed Bay enough to hire him on to the film. He is killed during an air strike in the battle of Egypt. Although in the movie Long Haul's alt mode is a Caterpiller 773B, a relatively small truck, Nizzi had originally meant Long Haul to be a Caterpillar 797. In Dark of the Moon, Long Haul is reused in the battle of Chicago before it is destroyed by Optimus. He forms the right leg of Devastator.

Scrapper
Scrapper is a Constructicon who transforms into a yellow Caterpillar 992G scoop loader. He is killed during an air strike in the battle of Egypt. His copy forms the right arm of Devastator.

In Dark of the Moon, Scrapper's character model is reused for an unnamed Decepticon in the battle of Chicago before it is destroyed by Optimus.

Scavenger
Scavenger is a large Constructicon. He appears in the final battle of Egypt, where he and the Constructicons form Devastator, but is killed by a prototype railgun. He forms the upper body of Devastator.

Overload
Overload is a Constructicon who transforms into a red Komatsu HD465-7 Tractor Truck articulated dump truck. He appears in the final battle of Egypt, where he and the Constructicons form Devastator, but is killed by a prototype railgun. He forms the lower waist of Devastator.

Hightower
Hightower is a Constructicon who transforms into a yellow KOBELCO CK2500 II crawler crane. He is only seen in vehicle mode. He appears in the final battle of Egypt, where he and the Constructicons form Devastator, but is killed by a prototype railgun. He forms the left arm of Devastator.

Scrapmetal
Scrapmetal is a Constructicon who transforms into a yellow Volvo EC700C crawler excavator fitted with a Stanley UP 45SV attachment. He joins Mixmaster, Long Haul, and Rampage on the retrieval mission to recover Megatron. He is ripped apart by his allies to provide components for Megatron. A copy of Scrapmetal forms the left hand of Devastator.

Dreads
The Dreads are a group of Decepticons who transform into black Chevrolet Suburban emergency vehicles. They attack Sam, Bumblebee, Sideswipe, and Mirage on the highway, and later fight Ironhide and Sideswipe.

Crankcase
Crankcase is the leader of the Dreads who specializes in stealing information. He is killed by Ironhide and Sideswipe.

Crowbar
Crowbar (voiced by Jimmie Wood) is the Dreads' second-in-command that specializes in entering secured areas and systems. Crowbar is armed with Cybertronian guns. He is shot in the face by Ironhide.

Hatchet
Hatchet is the Dreads' dog-like hunting Dread. He is killed by Bumblebee and Mirage on the highway.

KSI Drones
The KSI Drones are the human-made Transformers that were commissioned by Attinger and built by KSI. They can change their forms on a molecular level, and are built with the metal extracted from the remains of dead Transformers. They were originally mindless drones remote-controlled by humans, but are granted autonomy by Galvatron, organizing them into a new Decepticon army. They fight in the battle of Hong Kong, but are destroyed by the Autobots, Cade Yeager, and the Dinobots.

Galvatron
Galvatron (voiced by Frank Welker) is a KSI prototype modeled after Optimus Prime, but corrupted and possessed by part of Megatron's mind who transforms into a black and grey 2014 Freightliner Argosy cab over truck. After Optimus Prime kills Lockdown, Galvatron escapes vowing to have his revenge.

Stinger
Stinger is a KSI prototype modeled after Bumblebee, who later becomes a Decepticon and transforms into a red and black 2013 Pagani Huayra. He has his head blown off by Bumblebee and is eaten by Strafe.

Junkheap
Junkheap is a KSI prototype who becomes a Decepticon and transforms into a green Mack TerraPro garbage truck of Waste Management, Inc. He can split at will into three different drones that share the same single consciousness, which are killed by Hound.

KSI Sentries
The KSI Sentries are KSI prototypes modeled after Roadbuster and transform into multiple different colored Chevrolet Traxes. Many are killed by the Autobots and Dinobots.

Two Heads
Two Heads are the two-headed KSI prototypes modeled after Shockwave and transform into Chevrolet Trax, who become Decepticons. They are killed by Hound and Optimus.

KSI Boss
The KSI Boss is a KSI prototype who is modeled after Barricade and transforms into a Dodge Caravan. He is killed by the Autobots and Dinobots.

Rainbow Dash
Rainbow Dash is small transformium probably-KSI drone who for a second is a Rainbow Dash (My Little Pony: Friendship is Magic) plushie before it turns into a gun.

Terrorcons
Terrorcons are a faction of Decepticons who appear in Transformers: Rise of the Beasts.

Scourge
Scourge (voiced by Peter Dinklage) is the leader of the Terrorcons and trophy hunter who transforms into a black Peterbilt 359 logging semi truck.

Nightbird
Nightbird (voiced by Michaela Jaé Rodriguez) is a member of the Terrorcons as Scourge's second-in-command, who transforms into a Nissan Skyline GT-R R33.

Freezer
Freezer is a member of the Terrorcons who transforms into weapon artillery for Scourge and his fellow Terrorcons.

Battletrap
Battletrap (voiced by David Sobolov) is a Terrorcon who transforms into an orange 1980s GMC TopKick C7000 tow truck.

Humans
There are different human characters that appear in this film where some of them either support the Autobots or play other roles. There are also a few human villains that the Autobots also face off against.

Sam Witwicky
Samuel James "Sam" Witwicky (portrayed by Shia LaBeouf) appears as a protagonist in the first three films of the franchise.

He is implied to have died by the events of The Last Knight, when Edmund Burton mentions his status as the last Witwicky to Cade Yeager as his picture is also seen. Sam's cousin is nicknamed Spike in reference to Spike Witwicky from Transformers Generation 1. As Sam is the last of the order of Witwiccans, it means he is another descendant of Merlin.

William Lennox
William "Demented Spanner" Lennox (portrayed by Josh Duhamel in the films, voiced by John DiMaggio in the Revenge of the Fallen video game) is a good and dedicated, persevered Army Rangers officer and later a member of NEST aiding the Autobots. In the first film, he and his crew return to a SOCCENT base in Qatar after going on a mission behind enemy lines. His base is destroyed by Blackout, forcing him and the rest of the squad to flee. They are intercepted by Scorponok, but they manage to damage him with the help of aerial reinforcements and capture his stinger. Upon returning to the US, they are brought to Hoover Dam where they encounter a frozen Megatron. He and his team threaten Agent Simmons and the rest of the Sector 7 special agents when Simmons refuses to release Bumblebee. He fights alongside the Autobots to protect Sam, and defeats Blackout during this fight.

In the second film, Lennox is a US Army Major and serves as the field commander of NEST and is promoted to Lieutenant Colonel by the third film.

After NEST is dissolved, Lennox is recruited to join TRF, which hunts both the Autobots and Decepticons. Lennox remains sympathetic to the Autobots and joins them in the final battle.

Mikaela Banes
Mikaela Banes (portrayed by Megan Fox) is a skilled mechanic, inherited mechanical skills from her father, Cal, a grease monkey and paroled car thief. She is Sam's classmate who later becomes his first love interest.

In the third film, she is mentioned to have broken up with Sam for unknown reasons.

Carly Spencer 
Carly Spencer (portrayed by Rosie Huntington-Whiteley) is Sam's second girlfriend and later fiancée. Critics were highly critical of Huntington-Whiteley and LaBeouf's acting; Peter Travers stated the two "couldn't be duller". Jason Solomons of The Observer wrote that "we're first introduced to Rosie via a close-up of her bum, segueing straight from the film's opening sequence and titles on to the pert buttocks and underwear of our heroine", and that Huntington-Whiteley's English posh girl accent "renders her practically unintelligible when surrounded by American accents and falling masonry". Much of the criticism towards Huntington-Whiteley compared her negatively to Fox. Lou Lumenick said that her "'acting' makes...Megan Fox look like Meryl Streep in comparison." Cody Benjamin of Intelligencer Journal found Rosie Huntington-Whiteley a "visually attractive replacement for Megan Fox and [she] does a decent job playing Witwicky's new girlfriend". In a positive review, Drew McWeeny of HitFix said, "She reminds me of Cameron Diaz in The Mask, an actress who doesn't really show off any range, but who gives a natural, winning performance and who is up to the challenge of this particular picture."

Robert Epps
Robert Epps (portrayed by Tyrese Gibson in the films, Avery Kidd Waddell in the Revenge of the Fallen video game) is a United States Air Force Combat Controller Technical Sergeant and a friend of Lennox. In the third film, he has retired from the Air Force but still works closely with the Autobots.

Maggie Madsen
Maggie Madson (portrayed by Rachael Taylor) assists the Department of Defense in decoding the virus left by Frenzy. Maggie realizes that those hacking into the government's data files are not human, due to the ease with which they made the attack. After copying the hacking signal to her friend Glen Whitmann, she is arrested by the FBI. The writers had initially envisioned Maggie as quirkier and more cyberpunk. She found many of her scenes difficult because of the high heels she wore.

Jorge "Fig" Figueroa
Jorge "Fig" Figueroa (portrayed by Amaury Nolasco) is an ACWO operative. Fig is wounded by a missile fired by Scorponok. In a deleted scene in the Blu-ray version of the film, Fig is seen dying after getting wounded by Scorponok, but his character remains alive in the finished film and he was offered to reprise his role in Revenge of the Fallen, which he refused due to scheduling conflicts with another project.

Patrick Donnelly
Patrick Donnelly (portrayed by Zack Ward) is Fig and Lennox's friend. He is impaled and killed by Scorponok with his corpse being dragged under the sand, he was later avenged when Jetfire crushes Scorponok's head.

Bobby Bolivia
Bobby Bolivia (portrayed by Bernie Mac) is a used car salesman from whom Sam purchases Bumblebee. Although he does not appear in Bumblebee, his dialogue from the first film is heard in the first trailer.

Seymour Simmons
Agent Seymour Rutherford Simmons (portrayed by Nick Pilla in Bumblebee, John Turturro in the other films) is a former arrogant and paranoid Sector 7 special agent, the son of Tova Simmons, Sam's unlikely enemy-turned-ally in the second and third films, and the last surviving member of the Order of the Witwiccans.

In Bumblebee, a younger Seymour works with Jack Burns when they are tricked into helping to find Bumblebee.

Leo Spitz
Leo Spitz (portrayed by Ramón Rodríguez) is Sam's whiny and cowardly college roommate who owns a website on conspiracy theories called www.TheRealEffingDeal.com.

Rodríguez endured  winds created by electrical fans while filming in Egypt, which resulted in him dislocating his shoulder and having to spend 45 minutes having sand flushed from his eyes.

At some point, the character was supposed to be called "Chuck" and Jonah Hill was considered for the role.

Theodore Galloway
Theodore Galloway (portrayed by John Benjamin Hickey in the film, voiced by Bryce Johnson in the Revenge of the Fallen video game) is the American National Security Adviser who believes the Autobots' presence on Earth is the reason for the Decepticons still remaining on the planet. He develops prejudice and contempt towards the Autobots. After Megatron's return and Optimus' death, Galloway orders a shutdown on the partnership with NEST and the Autobots, have Optimus' corpse shipped to Diego Garcia, and tells Lennox and his men to stand down. During the flight to Garcia, Lennox straps him into a parachute and throws him out of the plane. He lands in an uncharted Egyptian desert, and angrily calls General Morshower to complain, who hangs up on him.

Charlotte Mearing
Charlotte Mearing (portrayed by Frances McDormand) is the Director of National Intelligence. She has a history with Agent Simmons. She is portrayed by Frances McDormand.

Dutch Gerhardt
Dutch Gerhardt (portrayed by Alan Tudyk) is Agent Simmons' assistant.

Dutch was once supposedly a cut-throat assassin and drug addict who was quick on the trigger, but has since put that aside to start a new, civilized life; Tudyk originated the role in the 2000 comedy-drama film 28 Days, deciding during the production of Dark of the Moon to portray Dutch as "the same guy. Not only does he kind of seem like the same guy—he’s the absolute same guy."

Jerry "Deep" Wang
Jerry "Deep" Wang (portrayed by Ken Jeong) is a paranoid software programmer and conspiracy theorist who stalks Sam at work. Jerry then gives Sam information about the moon program, assassinations, and the "Dark Side of the Moon". He is revealed to be allied with the Decepticons, but is "suicide"/killed by Laserbeak for giving Sam the information about the Moon's secrets.

Dimitiri
Dimitri (portrayed by Elya Baskin) is a former cosmonaut who was supposed to travel to the dark side of the Moon. He gives Sam, Simmons, and Dutch the information about the Moon, showing them pictures and revealing Pillars being stockpiled on the Moon.

Alexi Voskhod
Alexi Voskhod (portrayed by Ravil Isyanov) is a scientist who learns the secrets of the Moon and is killed by Laserbeak.

Dylan Gould
Dylan Gould (portrayed by Patrick Dempsey) is the CEO of Hotchkiss Gould Investments who is a last human collaborator and secret agent for the Decepticons. His father first met with Soundwave and Laserbeak. In the Battle of Chicago, he is killed for betraying his people and planet by Sam when he is knocked into the activated control pillar.

Cade Yeager
Cade Yeager (portrayed by Mark Wahlberg) is a single father and an inventor who builds robots for money for his daughter, Tessa, to keep her safe after he made a promise to his wife before she died. He first appeared in Transformers: Age of Extinction, where Cade found a rusty truck which reveals to be no one else than: Optimus Prime 

Cade returns in Transformers: The Last Knight, where Edmund revealed that Cade is "The Last Knight" when the Talisman chooses him.

Lucas Flannery
Lucas Flannery (portrayed by T.J. Miller) is Cade's best friend employee and a mechanic. He tried to escape with Cade, Tessa, and Optimus, but is killed by Lockdown's grenade and turned into stone.

Izabella
Izabella (portrayed by Isabela Moner) is a street-smart tomboy who grew up an orphan after she survived the battle of Chicago and becomes friends with Sqweeks and Canopy. Izabella became Cade's adoptive daughter and lived with him in the scrapyard.

Viviane Wembly
Viviane Wembly (portrayed by Laura Haddock as an adult, Minti Gorne as a young girl) is a professor of English literature at the University of Oxford and the last descendant of Merlin. She is kidnapped by Hot Rod until she meets Sir Edmund, Cade, Bee, and Cogman. She learns that her father had first met Hot Rod with a book of Merlin and the Staff. She is the one who claims the Staff of Merlin, and saves Earth and Cybertron from colliding with each other.

Jimmy
Jimmy (portrayed by Jerrod Carmichael) is one of Cade's friends and his employee in The Last Knight. He is hired by a wanted ad by Cade and hides with him and the Autobots in a scrapyard to avoid the TRF. When TRF drones sent by Santos chase him, Cade, and Izzy, he comments that those machines were meant to hunt down terrorists instead of "tax paying Americans". He is shot by one of them as a distraction so Cade can destroy it, but survives from a bean bag stuffed under his shirt.

Charlie Watson
Charlie Watson (portrayed by Hailee Steinfeld) is a teenage girl who works at an amusement park hot dog stand in Bumblebee. During her early life, Charlie was part of a champion swim team, but quit after her father's untimely death. She becomes friends with Bumblebee, who has lost his voice and memory after arriving on Earth. She is drawn into the Cybertron skirmish when Dropkick and Shatter track down Bumblebee on Earth, and helps stop them from revealing the location of Optimus Prime to the Decepticons. She realizes that Bumblebee has a greater purpose on Earth and they part ways. In the final scene, Charlie finishes fixing the car that she and her father were working on.

Mr. Watson
Mr. Watson (portrayed by Tim Martin Gleason) is Charlie's father. He and Charlie used to work on a car to make functional again. At some point, he died of a heart attack. Bumblebee first learns about him when he reviews his video of Charlie on a swim team.

Sally Watson
Sally Watson (portrayed by Pamela Adlon) is Charlie's mother.

Otis Watson
Otis Watson (portrayed by Jason Drucker) is Charlie's brother.

Ron
Ron (portrayed by Stephen Schneider) is Sally's boyfriend.

Noah Diaz
Noah Diaz (portrayed by Anthony Ramos) an ex-military electronics expert who lives with his family in Brooklyn, trying to support them.

Elena Wallace
Elena Wallace (portrayed by Dominique Fishback) an artifact researcher at a museum whose boss keeps taking credit for her work.

Reek
Reek (portrayed by Tobe Nwigwe) a companion of Noah and Elena during their global trek.

Sector 7
Sector 7 is a secret American government agency that deals with extraterrestrial technology and threats in Transformers. Following the fight in Mission City, Sector 7 was shut down.

Besides Seymour Simmons, the following are the known members of Sector 7:

Tom Banachek
Tom Banacheck (portrayed by Michael O'Neill) is the head of Sector 7's Advanced Research Division.

General Whalen
General Whalen (portrayed by Glynn Turman) is a general that supervises Jack Burns.

Colonel Jack Burns
Colonel Jack Burns (portrayed by John Cena) is an agent of Sector 7. A training exercise he leads is interrupted by Bumblebee's arrival on Earth, which Burns interprets as a hostile action. Before Bumblebee can explain himself he and Burns's team are ambushed by Blitzwing, knocking Burns out and damaging Bumblebee's voice box and memory cells. Seeing Bumblebee walk away from the fight, Burns develops an intense hatred of the Autobot, and later expresses suspicion of the Decepticons' intentions when they arrive on Earth, questioning their intentions based on their name alone. Although he spends much of the film expressing hatred for Bumblebee and openly claiming he wants to tear him apart, he changes his mind after Bumblebee saves him and helps him escape before the rest of the army arrives.

NEST
The Non-biological Extraterrestrial Species Treaty (or NEST for short) is a team of soldiers led by Lennox and Epps who help Sam in Revenge of the Fallen and Dark of the Moon. They merge with the human–Autobot alliance to fight the Decepticons. The team disbands after the Battle of Chicago, but remnants of NEST join as the TRF.

General Morshower
General Morshower (portrayed by Glenn Morshower) is the leader of NEST who communicates with the squad in the Pentagon.

After NEST is dissolved, he is recruited to join TRF.

Graham
Graham (portrayed by Matthew Marsden) is an agent of the fictional SASF and a member of the British Army Special Air Service who joins NEST.

Burke
Burke (portrayed by Brian Shehan) is a member of Lennox's eight-man team who survives Blackout's attack and later helps the Autobots at Mission City.

He returns in Revenge of the Fallen as part of NEST.

Stone
Stone (portrayed by Josh Kelly) is a former NEST member who went into retirement along with Epps in Dark of the Moon.

Kelly also portrayed Stone as a Strike Force team member in Revenge of the Fallen.

KSI
Kinetic Solutions Incorporated (or KSI for short) is the robotics company who works Cemetery Wind and builds the remote control Transformers in Chicago, later Beijing. After the battle in Hong Kong, KSI stops production of its remote control Transformers.

Joshua Joyce
Joshua Joyce (portrayed by Stanley Tucci) is the arrogant CEO of KSI who wants to build his own Transformers. He realizes that Megatron had been using his technology to improve himself and the other Decepticons. After Harold Attinger and Lockdown's deaths, Joshua helps Cade Yeager rebuild his farm house that was destroyed by Cemetery Wind as an act of reparation.

Darcy Tirrel 
Darcy Tirrell (portrayed by Sophia Myles) is a geologist assistant and Joyce's ex-girlfriend. She discovers cyber-formed dinosaurs in the Arctic, leading her to suspect that the Seed is more dangerous than Joshua is willing to admit.

Su Yueming
Su Yueming (portrayed by Li Bingbing) is the owner of the Chinese factory in Beijing, used by KSI to build more artificial Transformers.

Cemetery Wind
Cemetery Wind is a secret black ops unit of the CIA that works with KSI. They are asked to hunt down the Decepticons only, but without the President and their own agency's knowledge, Cemetery Wind also tries eliminating the Autobots due to Attinger's belief that all Transformers were menaces to humanity, no matter their faction. After the final battle of Hong Kong and Attinger and Savoy's deaths, Cemetery Wind is disbanded for military crimes and was replaced with the TRF.

Harold Attinger
Harold Attinger (portrayed by Kelsey Grammer) is a rogue CIA operative who is the founder of the black ops division Cemetery Wind. Later in the battle of Hong Kong, he is killed after being shot in the chest by Optimus Prime.

James Savoy
James Savoy (portrayed by Titus Welliver) is a corrupted field leader of Cemetery Wind and second in-command to Attinger. He is killed by Cade Yeager, who knocks him off a building during their fight.

TRF
Transformers Reaction Force (or TRF for short) is a military organization that seeks to eradicate all Transformers, both Autobots and Decepticons, hiding on Earth. TRF is created from the remnants of the rogue CIA unit Cemetery Wind, as well as from the remnants of military unit, NEST. They are willing to kill any allies and sympathizers among humans that the Cybertronians might have. Events cause TRF to create an alliance to the Autobots and Cade to save the Earth from Quintessa. After she is defeated, the former TRF members watch as the Autobots head to Cybertron to rebuild it and the organization is dissolved.

Santos
Santos (portrayed by Santiago Cabrera) is the commander of the TRF and a former Delta Force Operator who was born in São Paulo, Brazil, and grew up in Phoenix, Arizona. He seeks to destroy all remaining Cybertronians left on Earth as he believes them to be a threat. However he redeems himself and helps the Autobots prevent from destroying Earth and Cybertron from the Decepticons and Quintessa. He also reveals that the HMS alliance submarine is a female autobot.

Order of the Witwiccans
The Order of the Witwiccans is a group of the descendants of Merlin who know the presences and secret histories of Transformers on Earth that was founded in 484 AD. Most of its known figures that became members of this group include famous people throughout history. Their motto is "No sacrifice, No victory".

Sir Edmund Burton
Sir Edmund Burton: 12th Earl of Folgan (portrayed by Anthony Hopkins) is a historian, a member of the Order of the Witwiccans, and an astronomer. He knows Bumblebee from when he was a child. Burton has a portrait of every known member of the Order of the Witwiccans in his castle that consists of historical figures. He and Simmons learn the secrets of Cybertron and Unicron. Burton is killed by Megatron when trying to stop him from rebuilding Cybertron with Quintessa.

Captain Archibald Witwicky
Captain Archibald Witwicky (portrayed by W. Morgan Sheppard) is the great-grandfather of Ron or Judy, the great-great-grandfather of Sam, and a member of the Order of the Witwiccans. Archibald is a sea captain leading an exploration of the Arctic in 1897 when his dogs find a frozen Megatron beneath the ice. He accidentally activates Megatron's inertial navigation system that leads to a sudden power surge. The discharge etches a digital map to the AllSpark onto the lenses of his glasses. These were passed down over time and eventually given to Sam.

King Arthur
King Arthur (portrayed by Liam Garrigan) is the legendary British King of Camelot during The Dark Ages in The Last Knight.

Garrigan previously portrayed a version of King Arthur in Once Upon a Time.

Merlin
Merlin (portrayed by Stanley Tucci) is Arthur's wizard who formerly used his Staff, given by Stormreign, to aid Arthur against Saxon. When the staff extracts his DNA, it is revealed that he is Viviane's last descendant to protect his Staff from Quintessa.

Real life characters
Several real world actors play themselves in the films. Several of them are credited (or uncredited) at the end of each film.

 Buzz Aldrin plays himself, who greets Optimus Prime in Dark of the Moon. Cory Tucker plays young Buzz Aldrin in the beginning of the film in 1969.
 Bill O'Reilly makes a cameo as himself interviewing Agent Simmons on his show The O'Reilly Factor in Dark of the Moon.
 General Motors Vice President of Design Edward T. Welburn makes a cameo appearance as a KSI executive in Age of Extinction.
 Director Michael Bay makes a cameo appearance in Transformers where he is flicked by Megatron. He makes another cameo in Revenge of the Fallen aboard a C-17 transport where he and his crew were seen next to Optimus Prime in truck mode. He makes a third cameo in Age of Extinction as the driver of the truck, which Optimus Prime and Bumblebee destroy during their fight against Galvatron.
 Han Geng cameos as himself singing and playing the guitar in a parked car before being magnetized by Lockdown's ship in Age of Extinction.

Other Cybertronians
 Dynasty of Primes (three of them voiced by Michael York, Kevin Michael Richardson, Robin Atkin Downes) - Six of the Seven Primes. The Seven Primes are the first Cybertronians who travelled to distant galaxies looking for planets where they could build Sun Harvesters. It was during the Dynasty's rule that Sun Harvesters were not to be used in containing life. In 17,000 B.C.E., one of them defied the rule by powering up the Sun Harvester, an act that ignited a war and earned him the name The Fallen. To stop the destruction of both the planet and its sun, the remaining six stole and hid the Matrix of Leadership, sacrificing themselves to make a tomb of their own bodies, sealing the Matrix away. When Sam dies, his spirit communes with the six Primes and they tell him he has earned his destiny. They resurrect Sam, who uses the Matrix of Leadership to bring Optimus back to life and kill the Fallen.

 Lockdown (voiced by Mark Ryan in the film, Gregg Berger in Rise of the Dark Spark) - A Cybertronian assassin and bounty hunter who transforms into a grey 2013 Lamborghini Aventador LP 700-4 Coupe. In Age of Extinction, Lockdown works for Quintessa to bring Optimus to a damaged Cybetron and kill any Autobots who refuse to give up his location. He also makes a deal with Attinger to kill both remaining Autobots and Deceptions on Earth, while offering the Seed in exchange for aid in hunting Optimus. In a duel in Hong Kong, while trying to recapture Prime, Lockdown is bisected by Optimus from behind.
 The Shadow Raiders - Lockdown's techno-organic henchmen. They use their Drone balls to detect intruders on ship. Most are killed by Cade, Shane, and Crosshairs, while rest remain inside Lockdown's ship.
 Steeljaws - Lockdown's techno-organic wolf-like hounds. During the Autobots' raid in the Knight Ship while hanging on the cables, they are killed by Cade and Bumblebee.

 Unicron - A planet-sized Chaos Bringer, a very first Cybertronian and Cybertron's ancient enemy who formed around himself as Earth. In The Last Knight, his six horns only appeared when emerging and sensing a damaged Cybertron's approach to collide with.

 The Creators - Unseen mysterious pink extraterrestrial race who are the creators of all Cybertronians. 65 million B.C.E., in their ships, they invade every organic planets, using the Seeds, cyberforming the planet, ending the age of Dinosaurs to an KT extinction event on Earth. They harvest and use the resultant metal and the AllSpark to build Cybertronians. Million years later, Quintessa send Lockdown to Earth for one task - bring Optimus to rebuild a damaged Cybertron, kill any Autobots that interfere and wanting the Creators' "chessboard cleaned". They appear to be hostile and consider the intermingling of species to upset the cosmic balance. After Lockdown is killed, Optimus flies into space, stating that he is coming for them with the Seed.
 Quintessa (voiced and portrayed by Gemma Chan) - A forceful, malevolent Cybertronian sorceress and the "Prime of Life" who seeks to destroy Unicron (and Earth). She originally possesses a magical staff for Cybertron till her Knights betray her, steal and hide the staff on Earth. After Cybertron was destroyed in Dark of the Moon, she plans to destroy Earth to rebuild her planet by draining Unicron's energy with Megatron and a formerly-brainwashed Optimus, under her spell as "Nemesis Prime", to find her staff. Originally killed by Bumblebee from behind, she secretly survived, faked her demise when she using Space Bridges, disguises herself as a human and shows the humans how to kill Unicron.
 Infernocons - Quintessa's six demonic minions who replaced her Knights and which combine into Infernocus. In the climax, they are decapitated by Optimus in one shot.

 The Knights of Iacon - Twelve Cybertronian Guardian Knights who betrayed Quintessa, took, hid her staff on Earth within their crashed ship, and later gave it to Merlin during the Dark Ages. They also combine into a giant three-headed dragon named Dragonstorm.

References

Film Series
Cast And Characters
Transformers